Byssoonygena is a genus of fungi within the Onygenaceae family. It is a monotypic genus, containing the single species Byssoonygena ceratinophila.

References

External links
 Byssoonygena at Index Fungorum

Onygenales
Monotypic Eurotiomycetes genera